Femme Actuelle is a French-language weekly women's magazine published in Paris, France. It has also British and Spanish editions.

History and profile
Femme Actuelle was first published in October 1984. The magazine is part of Prisma Press, a subsidiary of the German media company Gruner + Jahr. It is published by Prisma Press on a weekly basis on Mondays. Prisma Press also owns other magazines, including Prima, Voici and VSD.

Femme Actuelle is headquartered in Paris and covers articles on fashion, cosmetics, literature, and entertainment.

The magazine has editions in the United Kingdom and in Spain. Its British edition is called Best and its Spanish edition Mia. Both magazines are also owned by Gruner+Jahr company.

On 26 July 2010 Femme Actuelle started its pocket size edition in addition to its standard edition.

Circulation
In 1988 Femme Actuelle sold nearly two million copies. The circulation of the magazine was 1,837,000 copies in 1991. It was the fifth best-selling magazine in France in 1999 with a circulation of 1,634,000 copies. The magazine had a circulation of 1,538,000 copies in 2001, making it the twelfth best-selling women's magazine worldwide. 

Femme Actuelle had a circulation of 1,346,850 copies during the period of 2003-2004. The magazine sold 1,292,000 copies in 2005. In 2006 its circulation rose to 1,710,000 copies.

In 2009 Femme Actuelle was the best-selling French women's magazine with a circulation of 927,420. The same year it was also the fourth best-selling weekly women magazine in Europe. In 2014 its circulation was 687,100 copies. In the period of 2017-2018 the paid circulation of the magazine was 580,249 copies.

References

External links
 Official website

1984 establishments in France
French-language magazines
Magazines established in 1984
Magazines published in Paris
Prisma Media
Weekly magazines published in France
Women's magazines published in France